The 2019 Women's Junior Pan-American Volleyball Cup was the fifth edition of the bi-annual women's volleyball tournament. Seven teams participated in this edition held in Lima. Cuba won the tournament defeating the Dominican Republic and qualified for the Women's U20 World Championship. Cuba's Ailama Cese won the MVP award.

Competing nations

Competition format 

 Seven teams will be divided into two pools. In the group stage each pool will play round robin.
 The two best teams from the first rank team of each pool after group stage will receive byes into the semifinals.
 The remaining first-rank team will play in the quarterfinals along with the second-rank teams.

Preliminary round 

 All times are in Peru Standard Time (UTC−05:00)

Group A

Group B

Final round

Championship bracket

Quarterfinals

7th place match

Semifinals

5th place match

3rd place match

Final

Final standing

Individual awards 

Most Valuable Player
 
Best Scorer
 
Best Setter
 
Best Opposite
 
Best Outside Hitters
 
 
Best Middle Blockers
 
 
Best Libero
 
Best Server
 
Best Receiver
 
Best Digger

References

External links 

Women's Pan-American Volleyball Cup
Pan-American
International volleyball competitions hosted by Peru
2019 in Peruvian sport
May 2019 sports events in South America